Roblin Park is one of the original neighbourhoods of the Charleswood community in Winnipeg, Manitoba, Canada. It is served by the Roblin Park Community Centre.

In 1946, Joseph and Violet Reynolds became the first to move into Roblin Park, at 105 (now 605) Pepperloaf Crescent.

References 

Neighbourhoods in Winnipeg
Charleswood, Winnipeg